George William Handy Jr. (December 5, 1924 – October 20, 1993) was an American Negro league second baseman in the 1940s.

A native of Wilson County, North Carolina, Handy attended Booker T. Washington High School. He made his Negro leagues debut in 1947 with the Memphis Red Sox, and played with Memphis again the following season. Handy played minor league baseball in the 1950 with such clubs as the Fort Lauderdale Lions, Norfolk Tars, and Winston-Salem Twins. He died in Brentwood, New York in 1993 at age 68.

References

External links
  and Seamheads

1924 births
1993 deaths
Memphis Red Sox players
20th-century African-American sportspeople